Kamen is a dormant stratovolcano located in the southern part of Kamchatka Peninsula, Russia, flanked by Bezymianny and Kluchevskaya. It is the second highest volcano of Kamchatka.

See also
 List of volcanoes in Russia

References 
 

Mountains of the Kamchatka Peninsula
Volcanoes of the Kamchatka Peninsula
Stratovolcanoes of Russia
Four-thousanders of the Kamchatka
Pleistocene stratovolcanoes
Holocene stratovolcanoes